Schleinitz may refer to:

Places
 Leuben-Schleinitz, a municipality in the district of Meißen, Saxony
 Schleinitz Range, a mountain range in north-central part of New Ireland, Papua New Guinea

People
 Alexander (Gustav Adolf) von Schleinitz  (1807–1885), Prussian statesman, minister of the royal household
 Siegmund Freiherr von Schleinitz (1890–1968)